List of country music artist George Jones' awards:

Awards

See also
 George Jones
 Academy of Country Music
 List of country musicians
 Country Music Association
 List of best-selling music artists
 Inductees of the Country Music Hall of Fame (1992 Inductee)

External links 
 Official Website
 Official MySpace
 George Jones Country Sausage
 Record Label
 at the Country Music Hall of Fame
 at the Grand Ole Opry

Jones, George